The 1937 Flatenloppet was an ice race run on a small lake 7 km south of downtown Stockholm on 14 February 1937.

Classification

https://web.archive.org/web/20131030130126/http://www.kolumbus.fi/leif.snellman/gp371.htm

Flatenloppet, 1937
Auto races in Sweden